"Quits" is a song written and recorded by American country singer-songwriter Bill Anderson. It was released as a single in 1971 via Decca Records and became a major hit the same year.

Background and release
"Quits" was recorded on January 14, 1971 at the Bradley Studio, located in Nashville, Tennessee. The sessions were produced by Owen Bradley, who would serve as Anderson's producer through most of years with Decca Records. Two additional tracks were recorded at the same session: "I'm Alright" and "Country Classics."

"Quits" was released as a single by Decca Records in July 1971. The song spent 17 weeks on the Billboard Hot Country Singles before reaching number six in September 1971. In Canada, the single reached number two on the RPM Country Songs chart. It was the only single spawned from his 1971 compilation Bill Anderson's Greatest Hits, Vol. 2.

Track listings
7" vinyl single
 "Quits" – 2:24
 "I'll Live for You" – 2:25

Chart performance

References

1971 singles
1971 songs
Bill Anderson (singer) songs
Decca Records singles
Song recordings produced by Owen Bradley
Songs written by Bill Anderson (singer)